In Prison Awaiting Trial is a 1971 Italian drama film directed by Nanni Loy. It was entered into the 22nd Berlin International Film Festival where Alberto Sordi won the Silver Bear for Best Actor award.

Plot
Roman surveyor Giuseppe Di Noi, who has lived in Sweden for many years and married a Swedish woman and respected professional, decides to take his family on holiday in Italy. At the Italian border he is stopped and arrested without any explanation. After three days in jail in Milan, he learns - through the efforts of a guard - that he has been charged with "manslaughter" of a German citizen. Giuseppe is deemed a "fugitive" and thus ineligible for house arrest; he is instead transferred from prison to prison until he reaches the imaginary town of Sagunto (near Salerno), where he gets placed in solitary confinement.

Di Noi undergoes a genuine judicial ordeal, full of humiliations. He is unwillingly involved in a riot, and as a result is transferred to a prison for inmates serving life sentences, and ultimately to a psychiatric facility. It takes the obstinacy of his wife, the passionate interest of his lawyer and the benevolence of the investigating magistrate otherwise on vacation, to arrive at a logical explanation.

While recovered at the hospital, Di Noi's lawyer learns about a highway viaduct Battipaglia-Matera - built years before by an Italian firm where he was employed as a surveyor - which collapsed and caused the death of a German driver in transit. The protagonist had subsequently moved to Sweden. Lacking international communications, he could not be notified a subpoena, and therefore technically became a fugitive. Even after regaining his freedom, Di Noi remains irrevocably marked by the ordeal, both physically and psychologically.

Cast
 Alberto Sordi as Giuseppe Di Noi
 Elga Andersen as Ingrid
 Andrea Aureli as Police officer
 Lino Banfi as Sagunto jailhouse director
 Antonio Casagrande as Judge
 Mario Pisu as Psychiatrist
 Michele Gammino as Don Paolo
 Tano Cimarosa as Prison ward
 Fulvio Mingozzi as Prison ward
 Luca Sportelli as Prison ward
 Gianni Bonagura as Lawyer Sallustio Giordana
 Nino Formicola
 Silvio Spaccesi as Marshal
 Nazzareno Natale as Saverio Guardascione
 Giovanni Pallavicino as Brigadier Saporito
 Mario Brega as Inmate
 Giuseppe Anatrelli as Inmate Rosario Scalia

References

External links

1971 films
1970s Italian-language films
1971 drama films
Films directed by Nanni Loy
Films scored by Carlo Rustichelli
Films set in Italy
Italian prison films
Films about miscarriage of justice
1970s Italian films